Peace Pagoda, Darjeeling or Darjeeling Peace Pagoda is one of the Peace Pagodas designed to provide a focus for people of all races and creeds to help unite them in their search for world peace. It is located in the town of Darjeeling in the Indian state of West Bengal. Like most of the other Peace Pagodas, it was built under the guidance of Nichidatsu Fujii (1885–1985), a Buddhist monk from Japan and founder of the Nipponzan-Myōhōji Buddhist Order.

The foundation stone of the pagoda was laid on 3 November 1972 by Nichidatsu Fujii, and was inaugurated on 1 November 1992. The pagoda was designed by M. Ohka, and it took 36 months to construct. It houses the four avatars of Buddha including Maitreya Buddha.

Gallery

See also
 Chowrasta

References

Peace Pagoda and Japanese Temple

Stupas in India
Tourist attractions in Darjeeling
Buildings and structures in Darjeeling
Buddhism in Darjeeling district